Linas Klimavičius (born 10 April 1989) is a Lithuanian professional footballer who plays as a defender. He is also a member of the Lithuanian national side.

Career
Klimavičius started his career as a teenage prodigy with Ekranas and then was promoted to the main-squad team. During 2008–2012, he played in the Ukrainian football clubs. He made a single appearance in the Ukrainian Premier League in a match for FC Dnipro against Metalurh Donetsk on 19 October 2008.

Dinamo București
In January 2019, Klimavičius signed a contract with Liga I club Dinamo București. One year later, in January 2020, he was released after 28 games played for Dinamo (27 in Liga I and one game in Cupa României).

Politehnica Iasi
On 12 January 2020, Klimavičius signed a contract with Liga I club FC Politehnica Iași.

FK Sūduva 
In 10 September he signed a contract with Lithuanian champions FK Sūduva.

Honours
Žalgiris
Lithuanian Championship: 2016
Lithuanian Cup: 2015–16, 2016
Lithuanian Super Cup: 2016, 2017

References

External links
 
 

1989 births
Living people
Sportspeople from Panevėžys
Lithuanian footballers
Association football defenders
Lithuania international footballers
Lithuanian expatriate footballers
A Lyga players
FK Ekranas players
FK Sūduva Marijampolė players
FK Riteriai players
FK Žalgiris players
Expatriate footballers in Ukraine
Lithuanian expatriate sportspeople in Ukraine
FC Dnipro players
FC Kryvbas Kryvyi Rih players
Ukrainian Premier League players
Expatriate footballers in Latvia
Lithuanian expatriate sportspeople in Latvia
Daugava Rīga players
Latvian Higher League players
Liga I players
FC Dinamo București players
FC Politehnica Iași (2010) players
Expatriate footballers in Romania
Lithuanian expatriate sportspeople in Romania